Kamoru Ibitoye Yusuf, MON (born October 16, 1968) is a Nigerian industrialist, best known for producing steel, iron and building items. He is also the Chairman, Manufacturers Association of Nigeria (MAN) Kwara/Kogi Branch; Chairman, Manufacturers of Basic Metal, Iron, Steel & Fabricated.

Yusuf is the founder of KAM Holdings, which specializes in the manufacturing of Iron and Steel products.

He was conferred with Honorary Doctorate Degree of Business Management (Honoris Causa) by the University of Calabar, Cross River state at the 34th convocation ceremonies held in March 2021; as well with Honorary Doctorate Degree by the Osun State University.

Awards and memberships

Awards and recognition
●Yusuf was awarded Nigeria's honour, the Member of the Order of Niger (MON), by president Muhammadu Buhari.

References

Living people
1968 births
Nigerian billionaires
Nigerian manufacturing businesspeople